Prescottia is a genus of flowering plants from the orchid family, Orchidaceae. It is widespread across much of Latin America and the West Indies, with one species (P. oligantha) extending into Florida.

The name is sometimes misspelled as Prescotia, including in the original generic description. The genus was named for John Prescott, so is to be spelled with a double t per ICN.

Species accepted as of June 2014:

Prescottia auyantepuiensis Carnevali & G.A.Romero in G.A.Romero & G.Carnevali - Venezuela
Prescottia carnosa C.Schweinf. - Venezuela, Colombia, Guyana
Prescottia cordifolia Rchb.f. - Costa Rica, El Salvador, Colombia, Ecuador
Prescottia densiflora (Brongn.) Lindl. - Brazil, Uruguay
Prescottia ecuadorensis C.O.Azevedo & Van den Berg - Ecuador
Prescottia epiphyta Barb.Rodr. - Brazil
Prescottia glazioviana Cogn. in C.F.P.von Martius - Minas Gerais, Rio de Janeiro
Prescottia lancifolia Lindl.  - Brazil
Prescottia leptostachya Lindl.  - Brazil
Prescottia lojana Dodson - Ecuador
Prescottia microrhiza Barb.Rodr. - Brazil, Paraguay
Prescottia montana Barb.Rodr. - Brazil
Prescottia mucugensis C.O.Azevedo & Van den Berg - Bahia
Prescottia octopollinica Barb.Rodr. - Rio de Janeiro
Prescottia oligantha (Sw.) Lindl. - widespread from Mexico and Florida though Central America, the West Indies and South America
Prescottia ostenii Pabst - Rio Grande do Sul, Uruguay
Prescottia petiolaris Lindl. - Colombia, Ecuador, Peru
Prescottia phleoides Lindl. - Minas Gerais
Prescottia plantaginea Lindl. in W.J.Hooker - Brazil
Prescottia polyphylla Porsch - São Paulo, Rio de Janeiro
Prescottia rodeiensis Barb.Rodr. - Rio de Janeiro
Prescottia stachyodes (Sw.) Lindl - widespread in Mexico, the West Indies, Central America, and much of South America
Prescottia stricta Schltr.  - Minas Gerais
Prescottia tepuyensis Carnevali & C.A.Vargas - Venezuela
Prescottia villenarum Christenson - Peru

References

External links 

Cranichideae genera
Cranichidinae